Bonellia  is a genus of medium-sized sea snails, marine gastropod mollusks in the family Eulimidae.

This genus has become a synonym of Niso Risso, 1826

Not to be confounded with Bonellia Rolando, 1822, a genus of worms in the family Bonelliidae of which it is a junior homonym.

Species
 Bonellia obtusa Anton, 1838 (taxon inquirendum)

Species brought into synonymy
 Bonellia brunnea (Sowerby I, 1834): synonym of Niso brunnea (G. B. Sowerby I, 1834)
 Bonellia imbricata (Sowerby I, 1834): synonym of Niso imbricata (G. B. Sowerby I, 1834)
 Bonellia interrupta (Sowerby I, 1834): synonym of Niso interrupta (G. B. Sowerby I, 1834)
 Bonellia splendidula (Sowerby I, 1834): synonym of Niso splendidula (G. B. Sowerby I, 1834)

References

External links
 To World Register of Marine Species

Eulimidae